Antonio Williams (1825–1908) was a seaman first class serving in the United States Navy who received the Medal of Honor for bravery.

Biography
Williams was born in 1825 in Malta and after emigrating to the United States he joined the United States Navy.

He was stationed on the  when it departed Hampton Roads, Virginia, 23 November 1877, and proceeded to Cuba on a scientific cruise. At approximately 1:00 a.m. on 24 November, near Nags Head, North Carolina, the Huron encountered heavy weather and wrecked. Initially the crew attempted to free the vessel but the ship heeled over killing 98 of the crew. For his actions Williams received the Medal of Honor in 1879.

Williams married an English woman and retired to the city of Bristol, England. He died on 22 July 1908 and is buried in Greenbank Cemetery, Bristol.

Medal of Honor citation
Rank and organization: Seaman, U.S. Navy. Born: 1825, Malta.

Citation:

For courage and fidelity displayed in the loss of the U.S.S. Huron, 24 November 1877.

See also

List of Medal of Honor recipients in non-combat incidents

References

External links

1825 births
1908 deaths
United States Navy Medal of Honor recipients
United States Navy sailors
Foreign-born Medal of Honor recipients
Maltese emigrants to the United States
Non-combat recipients of the Medal of Honor